The 2019 Arab Youth Athletics Championships was the seventh edition of the international athletics competition for under-18 athletes from Arab countries. Organised by the Arab Athletic Federation, it took place in Tunisia Radès from 4–7 July. A total of forty events were contested, of which 20 by male and 20 by female athletes.

Medal summary

Men

Women

Medal table

Participation

References

2019 Arab Youth Athletics Championships . Arab Athletics. Retrieved 2019-10-13.

Arab Youth Athletics Championships
International athletics competitions hosted by Egypt
Sports competitions in Cairo
Arab Youth Athletics Championships
Arab Youth Athletics Championships
Arab Youth Athletics Championships
2010s in Cairo
Athletics in Cairo